Raffaele Celia (born 4 March 1999) is an Italian football player. He plays for SPAL.

Club career
He made his Serie C debut for Cuneo on 17 September 2018 in a game against Pisa.

On 7 August 2019, he joined Alessandria on loan.

On 27 August 2021 he joined SPAL.

References

External links
 

1999 births
People from Catanzaro
Footballers from Calabria
Living people
Italian footballers
Italy youth international footballers
Association football defenders
A.C. Cuneo 1905 players
U.S. Alessandria Calcio 1912 players
S.P.A.L. players
Serie C players
Sportspeople from the Province of Catanzaro